is the second remix album by Japanese entertainer Miho Nakayama. Released through King Records on July 25, 1991, the album features six of Nakayama's songs remixed by ATOM. The first edition release included a 1991–1992 mini calendar.

The album peaked at No. 3 on Oricon's albums chart and sold over 138,000 copies.

Track listing 
All music is arranged by ATOM.

Charts

References

External links
 
 
 

1991 remix albums
Miho Nakayama compilation albums
Japanese-language compilation albums
King Records (Japan) compilation albums